Ramovš is a Slovenian surname that may refer to
Anton Ramovš (1924–2011), Slovenian geologist and paleontologist.
Darko Ramovš (born 1973), Serbian football player 
Fran Ramovš (1890–1952), Slovenian linguist
Primož Ramovš (1921–1999), Slovenian composer and librarian

Slovene-language surnames